Životice is the name of the following places in the Czech Republic:

 Hladké Životice, a village in Nový Jičín District
 Horní Životice, a village in Bruntál District
 Životice (Havířov), former village, now part of the city of Havířov, Karviná District
 Životice (Plzeň-South District), a village in Plzeň-South District
 Životice u Nového Jičína, a village in Nový Jičín District